Long Creek may refer to:

United States

Waterways
 Long Creek (White River tributary), a stream in Boone and Carroll counties of Arkansas
 Long Creek (Iowa River tributary), a stream in Iowa
 Long Creek (Beaver Creek tributary), a stream in Taney County, Missouri
 Long Creek (New York), a salt-water channel on Long Island
 Long Creek (Fore River tributary), a stream in Maine

Communities
 Long Creek, Illinois
 Long Creek Township, Macon County, Illinois
 Long Creek Township, Decatur County, Iowa
 Long Creek, North Carolina
 Long Creek, North Dakota
 Long Creek, Oregon
 Long Creek School (Oregon)
 Long Creek, South Carolina
 Long Creek Academy
 Long Creek, Sunnyvale, Texas

Canada
 Long Creek, Prince Edward Island, a community
 Long Creek (Saskatchewan), a river near Estevan
 Long Creek Bridge